The Glitterball is a 1977 British sci-fi children's film made by Mark Forstater Productions for the Children's Film Foundation. It was directed by Harley Cokeliss, credited under his birth name of Harley Cokliss. The film was screened at the 2010 Edinburgh Film Festival as part of a retrospective of 16 "rarely seen" British films made between 1967 and 1979, "rediscovered" after a year of detective work by event staff.  In 1979, Methuen Publishing released the children's novel by the same name, written by screenwriters Howard Thompson and Harley Cokliss. .

Plot
Two boys befriend a stranded alien in the shape of a little silver ball and help it to return home.

Cast
Ben Buckton as Max Fielding
Keith Jayne as Pete
Ron Pember as George "Filthy" Potter
Marjorie Yates as Mrs. Fielding
Barry Jackson as Sergeant Fielding
Andrew Bradford as Corporal
Derek Deadman as Ice Cream Man
Leslie Schofield as Radar Operator
Linda Robson as Checkout Operator

Awards and nominations
 1982, nominated for Fantasporto 'International Fantasy Film Award' for 'Best film' for Harley Cokeliss.

References

External links
 
 . Full synopsis and film stills (and clips viewable from UK libraries).

1977 films
1970s science fiction films
British children's films
Children's Film Foundation
Films directed by Harley Cokeliss
1970s children's films
Films shot at EMI-Elstree Studios
1970s English-language films
1970s British films